Korean tea is a beverage consisting of boiled water infused with leaves (such as the tea plant Camellia sinensis), roots, flowers, fruits, grains, edible mushrooms, or seaweed. It may or may not contain tea leaves.

History 

 
According to the Record of Gaya, cited in the Memorabilia of the Three Kingdoms, the legendary queen Heo Hwang-ok, a princess of the State of "Ayuta" (theorized to be Ayodhya, India), brought the Camellia sinensis (var. assamica) tea plant from India to Korea and planted it on Baegwolsan, a mountain that borders the city of Changwon. In practice, however, Labrador tea and fruit teas, such as magnolia berry tea and goji berry tea, were more widely used in the Samhan Era instead.

It is a widely held belief that the systematic planting of tea bushes began with the introduction of Chinese tea culture by Buddhist monks some centuries later. Some of the earliest Buddhist temples in Korea, such as Bulgapsa, Bulhoesa, and Hwaeomsa, claim to be the birthplace of Korean tea culture. The import of Chinese tea products started during the reign of Queen Seondeok of Silla (631‒647), when two types of tea bricks, jeoncha and dancha, were imported from the Tang Empire. In 765, a Buddhist monk is said to have presented an offering of the tea to King Gyeongdeok and the Buddha. Camellia sinensis tea plants spread throughout the country in 828, when King Heungdeok received seeds from the Tang Empire and sent them to be planted on the Jirisan mountain. Tea was usually offered to the Buddha, as well as to the spirits of deceased ancestors.

Tea culture continued to prosper during the Goryeo Dynasty. Tea offering was a part of the biggest national ceremonies, such as Yeondeunghoe and Palgwanhoe, and tea towns were formed around temples. During the reign of King Myeongjong (1131‒1202), Seon-Buddhist manners of ceremony prevailed. Jeong Mongju and other scholars enjoyed tea poetry, dasi, and tea meetings, dahoe. The state of daseonilchi ("tea and seon in accord") was eulogized. Xu Jing, a Song dynasty envoy who visited Goryeo in 1123, wrote in the Gaoli tujing that the people of Goryeo were avid tea drinkers and set out tea three times a day. Coins were accepted at tea and wine shops (茶酒店).

During the Joseon Dynasty (1392-1910), Korean tea culture underwent secularization. The royal family and aristocracy used tea for simple rites, a practice referred to as darye ("tea rite"), which is often translated as "etiquette for tea". Towards the end of the Joseon Dynasty, commoners adopted the practice of using tea for ancestral rites. The word charye ("tea rite"), cognate to darye, now refers to jesa (ancestral rite). In the past, the two terms were synonymous, as ancestral rites often involved offerings of tea to the ancestors. Wedding ceremonies also included tea offerings. The practice of packing tea into small cakes, which lost popularity in China during the 14th century, continued in Korea until the 19th century.

In 1895, King Gojong of the Korean Empire used coffee for the first time. In 1896, grocery stores began to have tea rooms as annexes, and the first modern tea house was established in 1924.

Traditions

Market

Herbal and fruit teas are commonly served, both hot and cold.

Varieties

From Camellia sinensis

Unoxidized 
 Nokcha ("green tea")Green tea, the most common form of Korean leaf tea, is an nonoxidized tea made from the dried leaves of the tea plant. Nokcha can be classified into various types based on several different factors. The most common is the flush, or the time of the year when the leaves are plucked (and thus also by leaf size): these varieties are named ujeon ("pre-rain"), sejak ("thin sparrow"), jungjak ("medium sparrow"), and daejak ("big sparrow").Loose leaf tea is called ipcha or yeopcha, while powdered tea is called garu-cha or malcha. Roasted deokkeum-cha ("roasted tea") are more popular than steamed jeungje-cha ("steamed tea").Southern, warmer regions such as Boseong, Hadong, and Jeju are famous for producing high quality tea leaves. Banya-cha ("prajñā tea") and Jungno-cha ("bamboo dew tea") among others are renowned. Nokcha can be blended with other ingredients, such as roasted brown rice to make hyeonmi-nokcha ("brown rice green tea") or lemon to make remon-nokcha ("lemon green tea").

Partially oxidized 
 Hwangcha ("yellow tea")A tea made of partially oxidized leaves of the tea plant. The tea, like oolong from China, is a cross between unoxidized green tea and fully oxidized black tea. The oxidation process for hwangcha is very specific, which enables it to develop its unique flavor.

Oxidized 
 Hongcha ("red tea")Fully oxidized tea, called black tea in the west, is called "red tea" in Korea, as well as in China and Japan. Jaekseol-cha, whose name shares the same origin as the green tea jakseol, is a traditional black tea variety from Hadong in South Gyeongsang Province.

Post-fermented 
 Tteokcha ("cake tea") or byeongcha ("cake tea")A post-fermented tea brick. Borim-cha or Borim-baengmo-cha, named after its birthplace, the Borim temple in Jangheung, South Jeolla Province, is a popular tteokcha variety.
 Doncha ("money tea"), jeoncha ("money tea") or cheongtaejeon ("green moss coin") is a post-fermented tea brick, made into the shape of yeopjeon, the Joseon coins with holes.

Other leaf teas

Flower teas

Fruit teas

Grain, bean, and seed teas

Root, shoot, and bark teas

Combination and other teas

See also 
 Misutgaru
 Sujeonggwa

References